A local election for 12 seats in the Tobago House of Assembly was held on 21 January 2013. The election was a clean sweep by the Tobago Council of the People's National Movement, winning all 12 seats in the Tobago House of Assembly, the only time this feat has ever been accomplished in elections in Trinidad and Tobago.

Political Parties

People's National Movement – PNM
Tobago Organisation of the People – TOP
The Platform of Truth – TPT

Results

PNM: 12 seats
TOP: 0 seats
TPT: 0 seats

The TOP secured 11,870 votes in the election while the PNM won overwhelmingly with 19,976 votes. The TPT gathered 675. 136 votes were rejected.

Vote count
Votes cast to the party listed by Constituencies:

References

1. https://web.archive.org/web/20150911021239/http://www.trinidadexpress.com/news/official_THA_election_results-188301641.html

2013
2013 in Trinidad and Tobago
Landslide victories